District scolaire 09 (or School District 09) is a Canadian school district in New Brunswick.

District 09 is a Francophone district operating 22 public schools (gr. K-12) in Gloucester County, exclusively in the Acadian Peninsula region.

Current enrollment is approximately 7,400 students and 500 teachers.  District 09 is headquartered in Tracadie-Sheila.

List of schools

High schools
 Louis-Mailloux
 Marie-Esther
 W.-Arthur-Losier

Middle schools
 Le Tremplin
 Léandre-LeGresley

Elementary schools
 La Ruche
 Le Maillon

Combined elementary and middle schools
 La Passerelle
 La Relève-de-Saint-Isidore
 La Source
 La Villa-des-Amis
 L'Amitié
 La-Rivière
 L'Envolée
 L'Escale-des-Jeunes
 L'Étincelle
 Marguerite-Bourgeoys
 Ola-Léger
 René-Chouinard
 Soeur-Saint-Alexandre
 Terre-des-Jeunes

Other schools
 La Fontaine
 PHARE Caraquet
 PHARE Néguac
 PHARE Shippagan
 PHARE Tracadie-Sheila

External links
 http://www.district9.nbed.nb.ca

Former school districts in New Brunswick
Education in Gloucester County, New Brunswick